Johnstonella is a genus of flowering plants belonging to the family Boraginaceae.

Its native range is south western and southern USA to Mexico, Peru to southern South America. It is found in the American states of Arizona, California, Nevada, New Mexico, Texas and Utah, as well as in the countries of Argentina, Chile, Mexico and Peru.

Taxonomy
The genus name of Johnstonella is in honour of Ivan Murray Johnston (1898–1960), an American botanist. 
It was first described and published by August Brand in Repert. Spec. Nov. Regni Veg. Vol.21 on page 249 in 1925.

Then in 1927, Ivan M. Johnston wrote that the genus of Oreocarya (in the Boraginaceae family) could be combined with Cryptantha.
Then Edwin Blake Payson in 1927 (A Monograph of the section Oreocarya of Cryptantha, Ann. Mo. Bot. Gard. 14:211-358) agreed with Johnston and Payson had four sections in Cryptantha: Eucryptantha (= Cryptantha), Geocarya, Krynitzkia (inclusive of Eremocarya, Greeneocharis, and Johnstonella), and Oreocarya.
Larry Higgins (1971), another expert on the perennial taxa, published a revised monograph of Oreocarya, and agreed with Johnston and Payson on the
inclusion of Oreocarya within Cryptantha, but also elevating the four sections of Johnston (1927) and Payson (1927) to subgenera. Although various species were sometimes still called synonyms of Cryptantha.

In 2012, the phylogenetic relationship of members of the genus Cryptantha was carried out, based on dna sequencing analyses, it was then
proposed that the resurrection of the following genera Eremocarya, Greeneocharis, Johnstonella, and also Oreocarya.

Known species
According to Kew:
Johnstonella albida 
Johnstonella angelica 
Johnstonella angustifolia 
Johnstonella costata 
Johnstonella diplotricha 
Johnstonella fastigiata 
Johnstonella geohintonii 
Johnstonella grayi 
Johnstonella gypsites 
Johnstonella holoptera 
Johnstonella inaequata 
Johnstonella mexicana 
Johnstonella micromeres 
Johnstonella parviflora 
Johnstonella pusilla 
Johnstonella racemosa

References

Boraginaceae
Boraginaceae genera
Plants described in 1925
Flora of the Southwestern United States
Flora of the South-Central United States
Flora of Argentina
Flora of Chile
Flora of Mexico
Flora of Peru